Duchess Marie Eleonore of Cleves (16 June 1550 – 1 June 1608) was the Duchess of Prussia by marriage to Albert Frederick, Duke of Prussia. She was the eldest child of William, Duke of Jülich-Cleves-Berg and Maria of Austria.

Life 
She was the maternal granddaughter of Ferdinand I, Holy Roman Emperor and Anna of Bohemia and Hungary, and sister of John William, Duke of Jülich-Cleves-Berg. 

While her father was a Roman Catholic, Marie Eleonore, displayed firm Lutheran sympathies early on. Her father was afraid that she would influence her younger sisters with her religious views, and therefore wished to have her married to someone of her own religious convictions as soon as possible in order to remove her from his domains, and thus considered grooms for his daughter that he would not otherwise have considered. Albert Frederick, Duke of Prussia, the son of Albert of Prussia, was thus accepted as a suitor, despite showing mental disorders. The wedding was conducted in 1573, and Marie Eleonore departed to Lutheran Prussia.

In 1577, her mentally ill spouse was placed under the regency of his cousin George Frederick, Margrave of Brandenburg-Ansbach, which made the position of Marie Eleonore more difficult at the Ducal court of Köningsberg. In 1591, she returned with her daughters to Jülich, where she remained until 1592.  She arranged the marriage of her daughters to German princes to avoid them being married by the Regency Council to Polish suitors, and by the marriage alliances she arranged, she ensured that the Duchy of Jülich would pass to Brandenburg after the death of her brother.

Issue
 Anna of Prussia (3 July 1576 – 30 August 1625); married John Sigismund, Elector of Brandenburg.
 Duchess Marie of Prussia (23 January 1579 – 21 February 1649); married Christian, Margrave of Brandenburg-Bayreuth.
 Duke Albert Frederick of Prussia (1 June 1580 – 8 October 1580).
 Duchess Sofie of Prussia (31 March 1582 – 4 December 1610); married Wilhelm Kettler of Courland.
 Duchess Eleonore of Prussia (22 August 1583 – 31 March/9 April 1607); married Joachim Frederick, Elector of Brandenburg.
 Duke Wilhelm Frederick of Prussia (23 June 1585 – 18 January 1586).
 Duchess Magdalene Sibylle of Prussia (31 December 1586 – 22 February 1659); married John George I, Elector of Saxony.

Ancestors

References

|-

1550 births
1608 deaths
People from the Duchy of Cleves
Nobility from Düsseldorf
Prussian royal consorts
Duchesses of Prussia
House of La Marck